Play thru Me is an album by guitarist Phil Keaggy, released in 1982, on Sparrow Records.

Track listing
All songs written by Phil Keaggy, unless otherwise noted.

Side one
 "Happy"  – 2:48
 "Carefree"  – 4:41
 "Nobody's Playgirl Now"  – 3:39
 "Cherish The Moment"  – 4:59
 "She Came to Stay"  – 3:35
 "Papa Song"  – 3:11

Side two

 "The Wall"  – 2:45
 "Make a Change"  – 3:31
 "Train to Glory"  – 3:09
 "Play thru Me"  – 4:26
 "His Master's Voice"  – 3:09
 "Morning Light" (inspired by Thomas Tiplady's poem "Above the Hills of Time")  – 3:31

Personnel
Phil Keaggy: guitars, bass, lead and BGVs
 Jim DeLong: drums
 Smitty Price: keyboards
 Michael Fisher: percussion
 Hadley Hockensmith: bass on "Happy," and "Nobody's Playgirl Now"
 Phil's wife Bernadette and their then 16-month-old daughter Alicia contribute vocals on "Papa Song"

Production notes
Produced by Phil Keaggy and Bob Cotton
Arranged by Phil Keaggy
Engineered by Bob Cotton and Wally Grant
Recorded at Sound Recorders, Kansas City, MO; Weddington Studios, North Hollywood, CA

Notes

References 

1982 albums
Phil Keaggy albums